Edgar Henrique Clemente Pêra (born 19 November 1960) is a Portuguese filmmaker. 
Pêra is also a fine artist and a graphic comics artist .  and writes fiction and cinema essays (PhD).
Edgar Pêra studied Psychology, but switched to Film at the Portuguese National Conservatory, presently Lisbon Theatre and Film School (Escola Superior de Teatro e Cinema). 
Aka Mr. Ego (scripts), Man-Kamera (image), Artur Cyanetto (sound).
Edgar Pêra has auto-financed and produced many his own movies, or directed "auteur films" for cultural institutions. 
" If there has been in Portugal a filmmaker who has continuously filmed (apart from the well-known case, in the opposite direction, of Manoel de Oliveira), he is Edgar Pêra, as a consequence of his availability and insistence on doing so regardless of the perennial problems of juries and public subsidies. But it is also a consequence of his adaptation to light technologies, he and his camera, constituting symbiotically an "Ego" that is really making its own film-diaries". (Augusto M. Seabra)
Pêra started as a screenwriter but in 1985 bought a camera, inspired by Dziga Vertov, and never stopped shooting on a daily basis. "Pêra has a penchant for odd, eccentric, obscure and sometimes twisted humor. His unique touches include an arthouse, avant-garde approach somehow combining retro and avant-garde modernities." (The Worldwide Celluloid Massacre)

For some critics he is considered "the most persistently individualistic Portuguese filmmaker". Edgar Pêra has done more than one hundred films for cinema, TV, theatre dance, cine-concerts, galleries, internet and other media. The first phase of Edgar Pêra's work started in 1984, shooting Portuguese rock bands in a neuro-punk style. Pêra's first film was shot in 1988 in the Ruins of Chiado, a neighborhood in the center of Lisbon that suffered a major fire that year. In 1990 Reproduta Interdita was shown at the Portuguese Horror Film Festival, Fantasporto. In 1991 he directs A Cidade de Cassiano /The City of Cassiano, a film about the Portuguese modernist architect Cassiano Branco (Grand Prix Festival Films D'Architecture Bordeaux). After this consensual film, Pêra goes into another direction, making more radical movies.

After O Trabalho Liberta?/Arbeitch Macht Frei? and SWK4 - The Parallel Universes of Almada Negreiros, Pêra directs his first fiction feature in 1994, Manual de Evasão LX 94/Manual of Evasion  (for Lisbon 1994 Capital of Culture), articulating an aesthetic legacy of soviet constructivist silent films, with what the filmmaker called "a neuro-punk way of creating and capturing instantaneous reality". Many years after its release, The Worldwide Celluloid Massacre wrote that Manual of Evasion is a "Portuguese thought-provoking experimental movie with a great potential for cult status." Pêra invited three major counterculture American writers: Terence McKenna, Robert Anton Wilson and Rudy Rucker and asked them about the nature of time. Manual of Evasion LX94 was received in Portugal with very strong criticism, both for and against the movie.

In 1996 Edgar Pêra founded, with the "elementaristic" writer Manuel Rodrigues, Akademia Luzoh-Galaktica, a trans-media working and learning space. During that time Pêra produced and directed several films made with students and took four years to edit the feature, A Janela (Maryalva Mix)/The Window (Don Juan Mix), premiered at the Locarno Festival in 2001.

From then there's change in Pêra's work, inflecting towards a more emotional cinema, but keeping the emphasis in non-realist aesthetics and eccentric humor. In 2006 Edgar Pêra has a retrospective at the Indie Lisboa winning awards in every category of the festival for a more consensual film: Movimentos Perpétuos/Perpetual Movements, a cine-tribute to legendary Portuguese guitar composer and player Carlos Paredes. 
In Paris he wins the Pasolini Award for his career, along with Alejandro Jodorowsky and Fernando Arrabal. Critic and programmer Olaf Möller wrote that'"Pêra is too different from everything which we regard as 'correct', 'valid' within the culture of film, 'realistic' in a cinematic, socio-political way. Put more precisely: Edgar Pêra is different from everything that we know about Portugal"

O Barão/The Baron, an adaptation of Branquinho da Fonseca's novella of the same name, premiered in 2011 at the International Film Festival Rotterdam. * Sight and Sound critic Jonathan Romney wrote that "Its atmosphere and style are foremost in a melange which variously echoes Welles, James Whale, Cocteau, Hammer and (inevitably) Edward D. Wood Jr.".

Over the past five years Pêra has been assembling his personal archives and made documentaries about Madredeus and other artists.

In 2011 he started to work intensively in the 3D format. His most controversial film yet, Cinesapiens is a segment of 3X3D, an anthology 3D feature with 2 other films by Jean-Luc Godard and Peter Greenaway, premiered at the closing night of La Semaine de la Critique of the Cannes Film festival.

In 2014 Pêra directed two 3D films, Stillness and Lisbon Revisited. Stillness, premiered at the Oberhausen Film Festival was also a polemical movie: it was considered "astonishingly offensive"., Lisbon Revisited, with words by Portuguese poet Fernando Pessoa, premiered at the Locarno Festival. 
Pêra directs, also in 2014, the pop comedy feature Virados do Avesso/Turned Inside Out -  his first commercial success in Portugal (120.000 spectators).  O Espectador Espantado/The Amazed Spectator, a "kino-investigation about spectatorship" premiered at the Rotterdam Film Festival, 2016 and it was also the title of his PhD thesis. In 2016 there's also a major retrospective of his work at the Serralves Museum in Porto. Delirium in Las Vedras, about the Portuguese Carnival in Torres Vedras premiered in Rotterdam and São Paulo 2017. In 2018, O Homem-Pykante Diálogos Kom Pimenta, about the poet Alberto Pimenta, premiered at IndieLisboa. Caminhos Magnéticos/Magnethick Pathways, starring Dominique Pinon, premiered at the São Paulo Film Festival 2018.

Filmography

Features

 Vida e Obra de Cassiano Branco/Life & Work of Cassiano Branco (documentary) (1991)
 Manual de Evasão LX94/Manual Of Evasion LX94 (1994)
 A Janela (Maryalva Mix)/The Window (Maryalva Mix) (2001)
 Oito, oito/Eight Eight (originally for TV feature) (2001)
 O Homem-Teatro/The Man-Theatre (2001)
 Movimentos Perpétuos: Cine-Tributo a Carlos Paredes/Perpetual Movements:Cine-Tribute to Carlos Paredes (2006)
 Rio Turvo/Muddy River (2007)
 Punk Is Not Daddy (documentary) (2012)
 O Barão/The Baron (2011)
 Visões de Madredeus/Vision of Madredeus(documentary) (2012)
 Cinesapiens segment from 3X3D (together with Jean-Luc Godard and Peter Greenaway) (2013)
 Lisbon Revisited(2014)
 [O Espectador Espantado/[The Amazed Spectator]](2016)
 Adeus Carne/Goodbye Flesh(2017)
 o Homem-Pykante Diálogos Kom Pimenta/Spicy-Man(2018)
 Caminhos Magnétykos/Magnetick Pathways (2018)
 KINORAMA - BEYOND THE WALLS OF CINEMA (2019)

Short films

 Reproduta Interdita (1990)
 A Cidade de Cassiano/The City of Cassiano (1991)
 Matadouro/Slaughterhouse (1991)
 Guerra ou Paz?/War or Peace? (1992)
 Achbeit Macht Frei?/O Trabalho Liberta?/Work Liberates? (documentary) (1993)
 SWK4 (1993)
 O Mundo Desbotado/Fading World (1995)
 Túneis de Realidade (Who Is The Master Who Makes The Grass Green?) (1996)
 25 de Abril: uma Aventura para a Democracia (documentary) (2000)
 Guitarra (com gente lá dentro)/Guitar (With People Inside) (2003)
 És a Nossa Fé/Our Faith (documentary) (2004)
 Stadium (Phantas-Mix) (2005)
 Impending Doom (2006)
 Arquitectura de Peso/Heavy Architecture (2007)
 Crime Azul/Bleu Krime (2009)
 Avant La Corrida (2009)
 One Way Or another (Reflections of a Psycho-Killer) (2012)
 Stillness (2014)
 The Cavern (2015–16)
 Goodbye Flesh (2017)
 KINO-POP ARCHIVES (13 short films for tv) (2018)

Proto-Films

 A Konspyração dos 1000 Tympanus/The 1000 Eardrums Konspiracy (1996)
 Champô Chaimite (2002)
 Os Homens-Toupeira/The Mole-man Saga (feature, 2003)
 Horror no Bairro Vermelho (Prólogo Documental)/Horror in the Red District (Documentary Prologue) (2011)

Films with students

 The Day of The Musician by Eric Satie (1996)
 The Misadventures of Man-Kamera Episodes 113 & 115 (1998)

Kino-Diaries(selection)
 Rua Anchieta (2016)
 Busan 3D Kino-Diary (2013)
 My Father's Hometown/Viagem com o meu pai a Coimbra (2011)
 Planeland 4 (2004)
 Keep Moooving 1 (2004)
 Krashlanding in Lisbon-98 (Also it's about time) (1998)
 Cacilhas-Cascais (Hip Hop Agit-Train) (1996)
 At Cabo Espichel with my Parents (1986)

Video Installations

 Trans-LX (1990)
 O Movimento da Pedra (1990)
 Videokorporis (1992)
 Não Há Flores! (1992)
 666-O Triunfo do Azeite (video-performance) (1994)
 Incêndio no Museu Kabazov (1995)
 Satie live-mix (cine-performance) (1996)
 FashionViktimz (1996)
 Bica Amor & Fakadas (video and super 8 installation) (1997)
 Konsciêncya (1998)
 Kantos Enokyanus (1998)
 Cinekomix Marvels (1999)
 Eskynas Agudas (1999)
 A Porta (2000)
 The Master Person Tapes/Os Filmes do Desassossego de Mestre Pessoa (2002)
 Fiquem Qom a Qultura, eu fiko kom o Brazzil (2002)
 Keep Mooving 2 (2005)
 Sub-Mundo (2015)
 Lisboa Revisitada (3D photography and 3D video exhibition) (2016)

Cine-Concerts (original films mixed with live-shooting by Pêra)
 LOVECRAFTLAND  Live Music by Randolph Carter (Paulo Furtado aka The Legendary Tigerman) (2018)
 FONTAÍNHAS  Live Music by Rui Lima and Sérgio Martins (Porto, 2017)
 VADE RETRO  Live Music by Tó Trips and João Doce (Serralves, Porto, 2016)
  Kino-Ping-Pong   Live Music by António Vitorino de Almeida (Lisboa, 2014)
 Lima & Louro – Filmes de Lisboa  Live Music by André Louro and João Lima (São Jorge, Lisboa, 2010)
 Kino-Diaries  live music by Micro Audiowaves and LIP (Serralves, Porto 2006)
 Koktail Filmzz live music by João Lima (ZDB, Lisboa 2005)
 Kino-Diaries live music by Novolari (ZDB, Lisboa, 2005)
 Granular Improvising with Microaudiowaves and LIP (Lisboa, 2005) 
 ABRIL-BRAZZIL live music by João Madeira (Lisboa, 2005)
 SUDWESTERN music Dead Combo with performances by actors-singers (Lisboa, Guarda, Amsterdam, 2004)
 NAKED MIND PROJEKT Live music by Vítor Rua (2002-2004)
 Straxt! films for the concert of Lydia Lunch (2004)
 Kino-Super8 live music by Francisco Rebelo (ZDB, Lisboa, 2000)
 As Alucinações Estão Aí! Live music by Nuno Rebelo and Jean-Marc Mantera (Lisboa, Porto 1995)
 Eles Sempre Aí Estiveram (1995) 
 Vizões Equações Radiações! live Music by Nuno Rebelo and Marco Franco (1995) 
 Cine-Fado live music by Manuel João Vieira (1993)
 Ultimatum Futurista live music by Nuno Rebelo (1993)
 Cinerock  live music by Tiago Lopes (1990)

Music vídeos

 Madredeus at IFP (1989)
 Korações de Atum Mini musical movie Lello Minsk and Shegundo Galarza (2000)
 U ke Faz Falta? film commemorating the 25 of April revolution music selected by Miguel esteves Cardoso (1995)
 Zombietown23 Texts of Terence Mckenna Aleister Crowley and Fernando Pessoa. Commissioned by Expo 98 (1998)
 You DJ Vibe & Ithaka (Ithaka Darin Pappas) location: Tokyo
 videoclips for GNR, Rádio Macau, Madredeus, Resistência, Capitão Fantasma, LX90, Rão Kiao, Black Company, Djamal, Terrakota, The Legendary Tigerman, Bullet, No Data, Orlando Cohen, Remexido.

Criticism and Praise

 "The montage is as relentless as the guitarist's finger-work, the footage as compelling as the music is poignant.", The Barbican (a multi-art organization) on Perpetual Movements
 "Cartoonishly weird comedy", The Worldwide Celluloid Massacre on The Window (Don Juan Mix)
"the find here is lesser known Portuguese director Pêra's weird and wacky whirlwind of a film; a sharply astute indictment of mainstream cinema and culture." (Arun Sharma about Cinesapiens and 3X3D) 

"Cinesapiens, keeps audiences guessing right to the final frame, ending with a surreal and haunting scene experience."
Cinesapiens: "pure visual chaos"

See also
 Cinema of Portugal

References

External links
 Edgar Pêra's channel on YouTube
 Allmovie
 
 World Wide Video Festival Biography
 edgar pêra filmzz: cine-diáryos de edgar pêra cine-arkives
   Kino-News

Portuguese film directors
Living people
1960 births
Lisbon Theatre and Film School alumni